West Silvertown is a Docklands Light Railway (DLR) station in Silvertown which opened in December 2005. It is located on the Woolwich Arsenal branch. Trains run Westbound to Bank in the City of London and Eastbound to Woolwich Arsenal, passing through London City Airport station.

The station is in the London Borough of Newham and is located in Travelcard Zone 3.

History
Prior to December 2005, Docklands Light Railway trains would arrive at Canning Town and would only be able to continue in a South-Easterly direction towards Royal Victoria. In December 2005, however, the new King George V branch was opened.

Design

The station (like most Docklands Light Railway stations) is elevated and can be reached from street level by stairs or a lift.

Location
The station is situated close to the site of Lyle Park, and was set up to serve Britannia Village and the proposed new development at Peruvian Wharf.

Connections
London Buses route 330 serves the station.

Services
Trains run westbound at least every 10 minutes to Bank in the City of London. Journey time is 3 minutes to Canning Town to interchange with the Beckton branch of the DLR, 8 minutes to Poplar to interchange with the Stratford and Lewisham branches of the DLR and 18 minutes to Bank in the City of London.

Trains run eastbound every 10 minutes to Woolwich Arsenal. Journey time is 2 minutes to Pontoon Dock, 4 minutes to London City Airport and 6 minutes to Woolwich Arsenal, one of the two termini for eastbound trains on the Docklands Light Railway (the other is Beckton).

In peak hours, the Bank-Woolwich Arsenal service increases to every eight minutes, with an additional service to Stratford International, providing a service every four minutes between Canning Town and Woolwich Arsenal.

Future
A future Thames Wharf station between this station and Canning Town is safeguarded and is being considered after the Thames Wharf development is given the go ahead and the Silvertown Tunnel is completed.

References

External links

 Docklands Light Railway website – West Silvertown station page

Docklands Light Railway stations in the London Borough of Newham
Railway stations in Great Britain opened in 2005
Silvertown